Greater is a 2016 American biographical sports film directed by David Hunt and starring Christopher Severio as American football player Brandon Burlsworth, a walk-on college player who became an All-American, dying in a car crash 11 days after being drafted high in the 3rd round to the National Football League. The film was released on August 26, 2016. It was the last film featuring Michael Parks to be released within his lifetime.

Plot
The year is 1999 and Marty Burlsworth is awaiting the funeral of his 22-year-old brother, Brandon. While others, including Marty's mother, Barbara, have accepted the loss and put their faith in God, Marty can not do that as he does not understand why God would take away his brother on the cusp of his stardom in the NFL. That doubt is shared by a stranger, The Farmer, who does what he can to reinforce Marty's anger.

As preparations for the funeral begin, the story rewinds to when Brandon was a 12-year-old with big dreams of playing for the University of Arkansas, and then his days playing high school football for Harrison High School football coach Tommy Tice. It is then that Marty and Brandon's long-estranged father, Leo, an alcoholic former musician, tries to get back into their and Barbara's lives. Marty does his best to protect his younger brother, due to being 17 years older than him and often mistaken for being his father.

When Brandon does not get a scholarship to become an Arkansas Razorback as an offensive guard, he is determined to join the team as a walk-on in 1994.  Offensive line coach Coach Mike Bender does not believe Brandon will make the team, due to Brandon not being large enough for a Division I-level college lineman. The sight of him is not lost on other players such as Nathan Ward, Anthony Lucas, nor Grant Garrettthe latter of whom is assigned as Brandon's roommateand they make fun of him relentlessly.

But with hard work, Brandon sheds fat and puts on muscle, eventually proving himself on the field and turning around everyone's opinion of him. By his sophomore season, Arkansas head coach Danny Ford gives him a scholarship, and Brandon earns a starting position at right guard on the offensive line. Inspired by Brandon, the team achieves near greatness in his senior year of 1998, all by working and practicing hard. After the season is over, Brandon is named an All-American, and is then drafted in the 3rd round of the 1999 NFL Draft by the Indianapolis Colts. After attending a workout session in Indianapolis, his position coach tells him that he foresees a great career ahead for him.

Eleven days after being drafted, Brandon is killed when he is hit head-on by a tractor trailer. When his brother Marty sees how much he meant to the people of his hometown and how many have shown up for his funeral, he rebuffs The Farmer, deciding to celebrate Brandon's life and move on with his own.

Cast
 Christopher Severio as Brandon Burlsworth
 Neal McDonough as Marty Burlsworth
 Leslie Easterbrook as Barbara Burlsworth
 Michael Parks as Leo Burlsworth
 Fredric Lehne as Coach Mike Bender
 Nick Searcy as The Farmer
 Wayne Duvall as Pastor Rick
 Quinton Aaron as Coach Aaron
 Patrick Duff as Howard Mudd
 Texas Battle as Anthony Lucas
 Grant Cook as Grant Garrett
 Josh Emerson as Nathan Ward
 Connor Antico as Clint Stoerner
 Lou Diamond Philips as The Car

Reception
While on Rotten Tomatoes the film has an approval rating of 69%, that is based on only 16 reviews, with an average rating of 6.7/10.  However, some critics found the work to be more of a faith-based movie rather than a sports movie with Variety describing it as follows.  "An insistent, clunky sermon about triumph through faith, David Hunt’s film is so determined to turn its subject into a Christ-like saint that it loses any sense of him as an actual flesh-and-blood man, the result being a third-string sports saga only apt to play to its devout target audience."

References

External links
 
 
 

2016 films
2010s sports drama films
American biographical drama films
American football films
American sports drama films
Sports films based on actual events
Religious drama films
Religious sports films
Films set in 1999
2010s English-language films
2010s American films